The Designated Victim (also known as  Slam Out) is a 1971 Italian giallo film directed by Maurizio Lucidi.

Cast 
 Tomas Milian as Stefano Augenti
 Pierre Clémenti as "Count" Matteo Tiepolo
 Katia Christine as Fabienne Béranger
 Luigi Casellato as Commissioner Finzi
 Marisa Bartoli as Luisa Augenti
 Ottavio Alessi as Balsamo
 Sandra Cardini as Christina Müller
 Enzo Tarascio as Del Bosco
 Bruno Boschetti as Butler

References

External links

1971 films
Films directed by Maurizio Lucidi
Giallo films
Films scored by Luis Bacalov
1970s Italian-language films
1970s crime thriller films
Italian crime thriller films
Films set in Milan
Films set in Venice
Films shot in Venice
1970s Italian films